
Year 825 (DCCCXXV) was a common year starting on Sunday (link will display the full calendar) of the Julian calendar.

Events 
 By place 

 India 
 A group of Persio-Assyrian adherents of the Church of the East, under the leadership of two Persian bishops Prod (or Proth, also known as Aphroth) and Sappor (also known as Sabrisho), reach Kerala, India and reside in Quilon.

 Europe 
 Emperor Louis the Pious begins a military campaign against the Wends and Sorbs. Duke Tunglo surrenders his son as hostage, and submits to Frankish rule (approximate date).
 Grímur Kamban becomes the first man to set foot in the Faroe Islands, and settles down in Funningur, on the northwest coast of Eysturoy (beginning the Norwegian Viking era on the islands).
 Murcia is founded by the emir of Cordoba Abd ar-Rahman II.

 Britain
 Battle of Ellandun: King Egbert of Wessex defeats Beornwulf of Mercia near Swindon. The battle marks the end of the Mercian domination of southern England. The kingdoms of Kent, Surrey, Sussex and Essex submit to Wessex, and East Anglia acknowledges Egbert as overlord (bretwalda).
 King Hywel ap Rhodri of Gwynedd dies after an 11-year reign. The kingdom is seized by his grand-nephew, Merfyn Frych of Man.
 Battle of Gafulford: The men of Cornish Dumnonia clash with the West Saxons at modern-day Camelford (approximate date).

 By topic 

 Religion 
 Borobudur, a Mahayana Buddhist Temple, is completed in Central Java (modern Indonesia).

Births 
 Ariwara no Narihira, Japanese waka poet (d. 880)
 Charles, Frankish bishop and archchancellor (or 830)
 Fujiwara no Yasunori, Japanese nobleman (d. 895)
 Landulf II, bishop and count of Capua (approximate date)
 Louis II, king of Italy and Holy Roman Emperor (d. 875)
 Muhammad ibn Abdallah, Muslim governor (or 824)
 Ono no Komachi, Japanese poet (approximate date)
 Tsunesada, Japanese prince (d. 884)

Deaths 
 Abu Ubaidah, Muslim scholar (b. 728)
 Hywel ap Rhodri, king of Gwynedd (Wales)
 Ida of Herzfeld, Frankish noblewoman (approximate date)
 Liu Wu, general of the Tang Dynasty
 Máel Bressail mac Ailillo, king of Ulaid (Ireland)
 Song Ruozhao, Chinese scholar, lady-in-waiting and poet  (b. 770)
 Rampon, count of Barcelona
 Welf, father of Judith of Bavaria
 Wihomarc, Breton chieftain

References